Xârâcùù, or Kanala, is an Oceanic language spoken in New Caledonia. It has about 5,000 speakers. Xârâcùù is most commonly spoken in the south Central area of New Caledonia in and around the city of Canala and the municipalities of Canala, Thio, and Boulouparis.

Current status
Xârâcùù is considered a recognized teaching language, and is part of New Caledonian culture.  It is predominantly used as the main language in the Nouméa area, and is not considered endangered by UNESCO due to it being one of the most spoken languages in the area, with more than 90% of Canala residents being able to speak some form of it.  Xârâcùù is the fourth-most spoken language in New Caledonia Kanak, with a teaching school in the Canala area, although primary language use is at home. Xârâcùù is taught in the Canala area due to the EPK (École Populaire Kanak), founded by Marie-Adele Néchérö Jorédié.  It is the only language that is being taught in the area and is taught in nursery, primary, two secondary schools, Thio (maternal Kouare village school and also in college) and in kindergartens in La Foa and Sarramea.

Xârâcùù has been taught since 1980 at the primary level in the popular Kanak school (EPK or Ecole Populaire Kanak) Canala, only establishment of its kind still existing in 2013, the students can then join public education. The language is also offered at the private Catholic college Francis Rouge-Thio and public college Canala.

Phonology and spelling

Phonology 
The language has twenty-seven consonant phonemes, ten oral vowels, seven nasal vowels and seventeen corresponding long vowels.  Current research has shown that there are numerous phonemic contrasts, which leaves little room for allophonic variation. Xârâcùù has 27 consonants, some of which are nasalized plosives that are quite typical of Oceanic languages.  is only found in loanwords.

Xârâcùù has 34 vowels: 17 short (10 oral and 7 nasal) all of which can be elongated.  

Efforts to determine the phonological history of the language have been met with difficulty due to Xârâcùù's lack of reflexes of established Proto-Oceanic forms.

Orthography
Xârâcùù is written with the Latin alphabet combined with many diacritics and digraphs, with a total of 61 graphemes. (Previously, missionaries used to transcribe the language (especially to produce versions of the Gospels or catechism) with the same conventions as the Ajië language.)

The orthography of Xârâcùù follows many of the same principles as most other New Caledonian languages: e.g. symbols usually used for voiced consonants (b, d, g, j, etc.) represent prenasalized consonants. Digraphs are used for a number of phonemes, e.g. bw, gw and ny for /ᵐbʷ/, /ᵑɡʷ/, /ɲ/ respectively; ch stands for /ʃ/, as in French. The large number of contrasting vowels and the inclusion of vowel clusters and vowel length mean that accents and other diacritics have to be used to represent vowel phonemes. Like in other languages of New Caledonia, nasal vowels are mostly indicated using a circumflex diacritic.

Grammar
Xârâcùù has a strict SVO sentence structure, with few exceptions.

Pronouns 

† Used only in the past tense.  ‡ Used with certain inalienable nouns.

* Used after the particle rè with vowel assimilation e.g. nea rè+rö > nea röö "your knife"

Noun phrase structure
In comparison to other Oceanic languages, Xârâcùù's noun phrase structure is a little different. Most of the vowel modifiers in Xârâcùù come before the head. Some articles that feature this include a singular, du dual, ké paucal, and mîî~mîrî plural.  There are several different morphemes for '10' and '15' which are just examples of a quinary numeral system.

Numerals
The numeral style of the language allows for few numeral classifiers that often only occur as suffixes to the number one and as prefixes to all of the other numerals in the language.

Prepositions 
Xârâcùù has at least 17 known prepositions, at least half referring to direction or location. Three prepositions express types of comitative relationships.

Possession
Like many Oceanic languages, Xârâcùù features indirect and direct possession constructions. The following phrases demonstrate that "inalienable" nouns are directly possessed with the possessor, whether pronoun or noun, being directly suffixed to the possessed noun. 

Indirect possession comes in two syntactic types varying by familiarity and a classification system. Seven possessive classifications have possessive pronominal suffix or are joined by the possessed noun. These classifiers usually refer to food nênê- (allomorph nânâ-), starchy foods or nèkê-, meat or (nê)wînè, food to be chewed or nèxêê-, drinks or (nê)wînyè-, tubers to be planted or harvested or nêngê-, and goods possessions or ngêê or êê.  There are also three other qualifiers including: xû or topic of story telling, (rö)wâ or passive, and rè or general.  In these cases the possessed noun comes first followed by the classifier and the possessor. A pronominal possessor does not occur as a suffix but rather a free form.

Morphology
There are only a few forms of verbal morphology in Xârâcùù.  These include the nonproductive transitive suffix –ri, the causative fa-, the resultative/stative mê-, and the intransitivizer ù-.  While transitive suffix do exist they are few and far between leaving the language to follow a strict SVO format for morphological marking.

Verb phrases
The examples also show that the object of a sentence can be topicalized by fronting the transitive suffix  as in vèè a- moving to the front of the sentence in example two.  There is also reduplication, which acts like a functions intensifier.  While there is a small amount of verbal morphology, each verb phrase can contain a preverbal subject-marking pronoun.  Subject and Predicate phrase order is unmarked in Xarâcùù. There are ten tense-aspect markers (some are preverbal others postverbal) and one or more modifiers can be included (also pre-verbal or post-verbal).

As seen above in example (1), preverbal subject markers are unused if the subject is a noun phrase.  But there are cases when there is a topicalized afterthought subject that follows the verb as seen in the second example where pa dopwa appears at the end rather than the beginning.  Polar interrogatives also exist in Xarâcùù but are marked by the particle kae.  The kae article follows the constituent that is the focus of the interrogation.

In comparison to many other Oceanic languages outside of New Caledonia, Xarâcùù uses unusual phrase structure for nouns.  The modifiers precede the head and the only thing that follows are demonstratives and markers of totality.

Sample texts
Various Xârâcùù stories were recorded by Claire Moyse-Faurie. They can be read and heard, on two archives: on Paradisec, and on Pangloss.

Sample sentences
Dou regula daa nä jina. -All because of that fateful day.

è wâ ket name: "wèi, jööpè nä, jè faxwata. -He asked for news

è cen xwata döbwa ke ket. -She would not listen to what you said.

Story of a flower

A traditional Xârâcùù short story about a flower and a girl who speaks with the flower and hear its life story.

A small poem about the sky and the land of Canala

Jari kè Xôkwé Ka History

A historical tale about a taro field and those who tended it.

Documentation

There have been two dictionaries written on the Xârâcùù language in the last one hundred years. 

The earlier work is a short English/Xârâcùù dictionary published in 1975 by George William Grace, titled Canala dictionary (New Caledonia).

Another key publication is Moyse-Faurie's 1995 grammar Le xârâcùù: Langue de Thio-Canala (Nouvelle-Calédonie).

Notes and references
COLLECTIVE:collective
INTERROG:interrogative

References

External links 
 Alphabet and pronunciation at Omniglot
 Interview with Marie-Adèle Jorédié on her language, Xârâcùù
 Videos on Sorosoro
 Open-access collection of recordings in Xârâcùù and Xârâgurè, by  – (archive: Paradisec).
 Corpus of audio and video recordings in Xârâcùù, by Claire Moyse-Faurie – (archive: Pangloss Collection).

Bibliography
 
 

New Caledonian languages
Languages of New Caledonia
Subject–verb–object languages